Copper fluoride may refer to:

Copper(I) fluoride (cuprous fluoride, CuF).
Copper(II) fluoride (cupric fluoride, CuF2).